Te Ioteba Tamuera Uriam  (1910 in Tamana–1988) was a politician, writer and musician of Kiribati. He was from Tamana. He wrote the Gilbertese and English lyrics and the music of the national anthem, "Kunan Kiribati".

References

I-Kiribati civil servants
Members of the Order of the British Empire
Members of the House of Assembly (Kiribati)
Government ministers of Kiribati
1988 deaths
National anthem writers